Cuneisigna is a genus of moths of the family Noctuidae.

Species
Cuneisigna cumamita (Bethune-Baker, 1911)
Cuneisigna obstans (Walker, 1858)
Cuneisigna rivulata (Hampson, 1902)

References
Natural History Museum Lepidoptera genus database

Catocalinae